The Fifth Government of the Republic of Croatia was the Croatian Government cabinet led by Prime Minister Nikica Valentić. It was announced on 3 April 1993, being formed by the ruling Croatian Democratic Union. Its term ended on 7 November 1995 after the 1995 Croatian parliamentary election.  The term of this cabinet saw the conclusion of major military operations in the Croatian War of Independence and the start of negotiations in Dayton, which would soon end the war formally.

List of ministers and portfolios
The periods in the table fall outside the cabinet's term when the minister listed also served in the preceding or the subsequent cabinets.

References

External links
Official website of the Croatian Government

Valentic, Nikica
1993 establishments in Croatia
1995 disestablishments in Croatia
Cabinets established in 1993
Cabinets disestablished in 1995